Freei (aka Freei.net, FreeInternet.com, Freei Networks Inc.) was a free internet service provider from 1998-2000. In 2000, FreeInternet.com was acquired by United Online, Inc. (owner of NetZero, Juno, Classmates.com and others).  In 2008, United Online re-launched FreeInternet.com as a Web site dedicated to free and discounted retail offers.

Services
Freei provided a free alternative ISP, allowing users to anonymously log on to the internet using the Freei software and dialer.  It reached over 2 million registered users nationally by 1999, and 3.2 million by the summer of 2000. In lieu of a subscription fee, the software displayed ads on the user's computer.

IPO filing
Freei filed for an IPO on March 31, 2000.

Bankruptcy
On October 9, 2000, Freei filed for bankruptcy after laying off 30% of its workforce.
One week later, on October 16, 2000, the rest of the workforce was laid off and the corporate headquarters in Federal Way, Washington was permanently closed. In early November 2000, Freei's remaining assets were sold at auction.

References

External links
Freei.Net Goes Nationwide: http://www.internetnews.com/isp-news/article.php/216381/FreeiNet+Goes+Nationwide.htm
Freei Files IPO: https://www.wsj.com/articles/SB954783493838149693 http://www.nasdaq.com/markets/ipos/company/freei-networks-inc-74808-2425
Freei Acquired by United Online: https://www.bloomberg.com/research/stocks/private/snapshot.asp?privcapId=94399
Mark Stevens, Sequoia Capital; Freei Director: https://www.bloomberg.com/research/stocks/private/person.asp?personId=75159&privcapId=223006296

Defunct Internet service providers
Dot-com bubble
1998 establishments in Washington (state)
2000 disestablishments in Washington (state)
Internet properties established in 1998
Internet properties disestablished in 2000